Shilta was a Palestinian Arab village in the Ramle Subdistrict of Mandatory Palestine.  It was depopulated during the 1948 Arab–Israeli War on July 18, 1948, by the First Battalion of the Yiftach Brigade in the  Operation Danny. It was located 15 km east of Ramla.

History

Persian to Mamluk periods
Shards from the Persian, Hellenistic, Roman, Byzantine periods have been found here, and possible shards from the Umayyad, Abbasid and the Crusader periods. During the Crusader era the place was called Kefrscilta or Capharscylta. Shards from the Mamluk period have also been found, though Finkelstein label this find questionable.

Ottoman period
In 1870, Victor Guérin visited and noted that the village was "reduced to a few houses, it succeeded an ancient locality, as is proved by several cisterns dug in the middle of a rocky platform flattened by the man's hand, and a number of stones scattered here and there or embedded in Muslim buildings."

An Ottoman village list from about the same year showed that Schi’ra had 13 houses and a population of 41, though the population count included men, only. It was noted that it was located east of Jimzu.

British Mandate
According to a census conducted in 1931 by the British Mandate authorities, Shilta had a population of 22 inhabitants, in 7 houses.

The village had a mosque at the north end of the village, and there was a shrine of Shayk Ahmad al Shiltawi near it.

In the 1945 statistics, the village had a population of 100 Muslims, with a total of 5,380  dunums of land. Of this, 27 dunams were used for plantations and irrigable land, 2,159 dunums were used for cereals, while 6 dunams were classified as built-up public areas.

1948 war; Israel
Shilta was depopulated after a military assault July 15–16, 1948.

Israel established Shilat and Kfar Ruth on village land in 1977.

In 1992, the village site was described: "The site is overgrown with mountain flora, including long grasses and pomegranate, almond, and carob trees. Some of the cactus hedges survive, and several wells also are visible. Israeli have built greenhouses for growing flowers, [] Israeli settlement houses have been built on village land."

References

Bibliography

External links
 Welcome To Shilta
 Shilta, Zochrot
Survey of Western Palestine, Map 14:  IAA, Wikimedia commons

Arab villages depopulated during the 1948 Arab–Israeli War
District of Ramla